Ibrahim ibn Ali Abu Salim, was Marinid Sultan of Morocco from 1359 to 1361.

Life 
Ibrahim ibn Ali assumed the throne in 1359 in succession to Abu Bakr ibn Faris.
He was in turn succeeded by Tashfin ibn Ali in 1361.

References
Citations

Sources

People from Fez, Morocco
Marinid sultans of Morocco
14th-century Berber people
14th-century Moroccan people
14th-century monarchs in Africa